<onlyinclude>

March 2022

See also

References

killings by law enforcement officers
 03